Sabre was a   built for the French Navy in the first decade of the 20th century. Completed in 1904, the ship was initially assigned to the Far Eastern Division. She returned to France in 1907 and was assigned to the Northern Fleet. Sabre became part of a local defense unit in Brittany four years later.

When the First World War began in August 1914, the ship was one of the leaders of a submarine flotilla, but was transferred to the Mediterranean Fleet in 1915. She was assigned to a patrol squadron in 1918 and was sold for scrap in 1921.

Design and description
The Arquebuse class was designed as a faster version of the preceding . The two vertical triple-expansion steam engines each drove one propeller shaft using steam provided by two du Temple Guyot or Normand boilers. Their crew consisted of four officers and fifty-eight enlisted men.

The main armament of the Arquebuse-class ships consisted of a single  gun forward of the bridge and six  Hotchkiss guns in single mounts, three on each broadside. They were fitted with two single rotating mounts for  torpedo tubes on the centerline, one between the funnels and the other on the stern.

Construction and career
Sabre (Musket) was ordered from Arsenal de Rochefort on 5 March 1901 and the ship was laid down in 1903. She was launched on 15 May 1904 and conducted her sea trials during May–June. Sabre was commissioned after their completion and was assigned to the Far Eastern Division. The ship was escorted from Toulon, France, to Saigon, French Indochina, by the protected cruiser  from 10 September to 25 December. The destroyer was transferred to the [[Northern Fleet (France)|Northern Fleet] in 1907 and was assigned to the local defense unit at Brest in 1911.

In June 1913, she became one of the leaders of the 1st Submarine Flotilla of the 2nd Light Squadron based at Cherbourg. Sabre was transferred to the Mediterranean Fleet in April 1915 and remained there for the rest of the war. The destroyer ferried King Peter I of Serbia from Valona, Albania, to the island of Corfu off the Greek coast. Sabre was based at Port Said, Egypt, from 1917. The ship was assigned to a patrol squadron at Rochefort in 1918–1919. She was struck from the navy list on 15 January 1921 and sold for scrap on 1 June.

References

Bibliography

 

Arquebuse-class destroyers
Ships built in France
1904 ships